Minnesota State Highway 68 (MN 68) is a  highway in southwest and south-central Minnesota, which runs from South Dakota Highway 22 at the South Dakota state line near Canby, and continues east to its eastern terminus at its intersection with U.S. Highway 169 and State Highway 60 in South Bend Township near Mankato.

Route description
State Highway 68 serves as an east–west route in southwest and south-central Minnesota between Canby, Minneota, Marshall, Morgan, Sleepy Eye, New Ulm, and Mankato.

Minneopa State Park is located five miles (8 km) west of Mankato.  The park entrance is located on Highway 68 near its intersection with U.S. Highway 169.

Highway 68 has concurrencies with:

U.S. Highway 59, in Marshall.
State Highway 19, in and east of Marshall.
U.S. Highway 71, in Redwood County.
U.S. Highway 14, west of New Ulm.
State Highway 15, south of New Ulm.

History

Highway 

Highway 68 was authorized in 1920 between Canby and Marshall.

Its western terminus was extended to the South Dakota state line in 1934.

In 1963, Highway 68 was expanded easterly between Marshall and Mankato by consolidating former State Highway 272, State Highway 93, and State Highway 83, and re-numbering them 68.

Highway 68 was paved from Marshall to Canby by 1940.  Many remaining sections of the present day Highway 68 were still gravel by 1953.  The present day route was completely paved by 1960.

Major intersections

References

068
Transportation in Blue Earth County, Minnesota
Transportation in Brown County, Minnesota
Transportation in Lyon County, Minnesota
Transportation in Redwood County, Minnesota
Transportation in Yellow Medicine County, Minnesota
New Ulm, Minnesota